Lawrence James Haddad  (born 17 June 1959), is a British economist whose main research focuses on how to make food systems work better to advance the nutrition status of people globally.

He is the Executive Director of the Global Alliance for Improved Nutrition.

Education and career 
Lawrence became the Executive Director of the Global Alliance for Improved Nutrition (GAIN) in October 2016. GAIN is an international organisation launched at the United Nations in 2002 to tackle the human suffering caused by malnutrition. GAIN seeks to improve the consumption of safe and nutritious food from sustainable food systems for all people, especially the most vulnerable to malnutrition. 

Prior to becoming the Executive Director of GAIN, Lawrence was the founding co-chair and lead author of the Global Nutrition Report (GNR) from 2014 to 2016.

From 2004-2014 Lawrence was the Director of the Institute of Development Studies (IDS), the world’s leading development studies institute. Before joining IDS in 2004, he was Director of the Food Consumption and Nutrition Division at the International Food Policy Research Institute (IFPRI) from 1994 to 2004. Prior to that he was a Lecturer in quantitative development economics at the University of Warwick.

From 2009-2010 Lawrence was the UK’s representative on the Steering Committee of the High Level Panel of Experts (HLPE) of the UN’s Committee on World Food Security (CSF). He was the President of the UK and Ireland’s Development Studies Association from 2010 to 2012.

Most recently he was appointed by the UN Deputy Secretary General to lead nutrition work at the 2021 UN Food system Summit. 

A development economist, Lawrence completed his PhD at the Food Research Institute in Stanford University in 1988.

On Monday, 25 June 2018, the World Food Prize Foundation awarded the 2018 World Food Prize to Lawrence Haddad, and David Nabarro, former special adviser to the UN Secretary General. Announcing the award Ambassador Quinn, World Food Prize President cited the recipients for their "extraordinary intellectual and policy leadership in bringing maternal and child nutrition to the forefront of the global food security agenda and thereby significantly reducing childhood stunting"

Haddad was appointed Companion of the Order of St Michael and St George (CMG) in the 2023 New Year Honours for services to international nutrition, food and agriculture.

Media 
Lawrence is regularly featured in news media, social media and blogs such as Al Jazeera, Forbes and The Guardian.

Selected bibliography

Journal articles

See also 
 Feminist economics
 List of feminist economists

References

1959 births
Academics of the University of Sussex
British development economists
Feminist economists
British people of Lebanese descent
Stanford University alumni
Living people
Companions of the Order of St Michael and St George